Elmir Kuduzović (born 28 February 1985) is a Bosnian professional footballer who plays as a left-back.

Club career
Kuduzović began his career in local club Radnički Lukavac. After several years in Radnički, he moved to Željezničar in 2005, making his debut in the Bosnian Premier League. In 2008, he became a member of Sloboda Tuzla, moving in 2010 to another Bosnian top flight club, Čelik Zenica. In the summer of 2011, Kuduzović went to Montenegro by signing with Čelik Nikšić. After winning the Montenegrin Second League and the Montenegrin Cup, he came back to Čelik Zenica. However, due to disciplinary problems, he was suspended by the manager Vlado Jagodić and was released from the club in mid-season after only making 6 appearances.

After Čelik, Kuduzović played for Zvijezda Gradačac, Sloboda Tuzla again, Radnički Lukavac again and Bratstvo Gračanica.

In June 2017, he signed with First League of FBiH club Velež Mostar. On 25 May 2019, Kuduzović won the First League of FBiH with Velež after the club beat Bosna Visoko 0–2 away and got promoted to the Bosnian Premier League. He left Velež in January 2020.

Shortly after leaving Velež, Kudužović signed a six month contract with Igman Konjic.

International career
After being a member of the Bosnia and Herzegovina U21 national team, Kuduzović played for the first team in an unofficial match against Poland in 2007. His sole official international was a June 2009 friendly match against Uzbekistan.

Honours
Čelik Nikšić
Montenegrin Cup: 2011–12
Montenegrin Second League: 2011–12

Velež Mostar
First League of FBiH: 2018–19

References

External links

Stats from Montenegro at FSCG.co.me

1985 births
Living people
Sportspeople from Tuzla
Association football fullbacks
Bosnia and Herzegovina footballers
Bosnia and Herzegovina under-21 international footballers
Bosnia and Herzegovina international footballers
FK Radnički Lukavac players
FK Željezničar Sarajevo players
FK Sloboda Tuzla players
NK Čelik Zenica players
FK Čelik Nikšić players
NK Zvijezda Gradačac players
NK Bratstvo Gračanica players
FK Velež Mostar players
FK Igman Konjic players
First League of the Federation of Bosnia and Herzegovina players
Premier League of Bosnia and Herzegovina players
Montenegrin Second League players
Bosnia and Herzegovina expatriate footballers
Expatriate footballers in Montenegro
Bosnia and Herzegovina expatriate sportspeople in Montenegro